Events from the year 1862 in Ireland.

Events
1 January – a formal partnership between Edward Harland and Gustav Wilhelm Wolff establishes the Belfast shipbuilders Harland and Wolff.
12 May – the Ulster Hall, a concert hall in Belfast, is opened.
July – the Glasgow & Stranraer Steam Packet Company's  enters service on the first Stranraer to Larne ferry service.
10 September – Eliza Lynch becomes de facto First Lady of Paraguay.
3 December – the Midland Great Western Railway extends from Longford to Sligo.
Undated
The Dublin Fire Brigade is established under the Dublin Corporation Fire Brigades Act.
Publication of The Leadbeater Papers, containing the first edition of the Annals of Ballitore by Mary Leadbeater (died 1826).

Arts and literature
Julia Kavanagh publishes French Women of Letters.
Charles Lever publishes the novel Barrington serially.

Births
2 April – Bryan Mahon, British Army general, Commander-in-Chief, Ireland and Senator (died 1930).
27 May – John Edward Campbell, mathematician (died 1924 in Oxford).
10 June – John de Robeck, admiral in the British Navy (died 1928).
11 June – Violet Florence Martin, author (died 1915).
14 June – John J. Glennon, Roman Catholic Archbishop of the Archdiocese of Saint Louis and Cardinal (died 1946).
21 September – Sir Thomas Esmonde, 11th Baronet, peer, MP and Seanad member (died 1935).
14 October – Samuel Cunningham, politician and Irish Privy Councillor (died 1946).
6 November – Edward Bulfin, British general during World War I (died 1939).
15 December – Jack (Nonpareil) Dempsey, boxer (died 1896).
Gertrude Kelly, surgeon and radical activist in New York (died 1934 in the United States).

Deaths
6 April – Fitz James O'Brien, author (born 1828).
21 May – John Drew, actor (born 1827).
18 July – John George de la Poer Beresford, Archbishop of Armagh (Church of Ireland) (born 1773).
30 July – Eugene O'Curry, scholar (born 1794).
30 November – James Sheridan Knowles, dramatist and actor (born 1784).

References

 
1860s in Ireland
Years of the 19th century in Ireland
Ireland
 Ireland